A zadruga refers to a type of rural community historically common among South Slavs.

Zadruga may also refer to:

 , a village in Kubrat Municipality, Bulgaria
 Zadruga (movement), a Polish neopagan nationalist movement
 Zadruga (TV series), a Serbian reality TV